Ceroglossus suturalis is a species of beetle in the family Carabidae. Five subspecies are currently recognized.

References

Carabinae